A knout  is a heavy scourge-like multiple whip, usually made of a series of rawhide thongs attached to a long handle, sometimes with metal wire or hooks incorporated. The English word stems from a spelling-pronunciation of a French transliteration of the Russian word кнут (knut), which simply means "whip".

The original

Some claim it was a Tatar invention and was introduced into Russia in the 15th century, perhaps by Grand Duke Ivan III the Great (1462–1505). Others trace the word to Varangians and derive it from the Swedish knutpiska, a kind of whip with knots. Still others maintain it is of generic Germanic origin, not necessarily Scandinavian, comparing it with the German Knute, Dutch knoet (both meaning knout) and with Old Norse knutr, Anglo-Saxon cnotta and English knot.

The Russian knout had different forms. The lash ended in a metal ring, to which was attached a second lash as long, ending also in a ring, to which in turn was attached a few inches of hard leather ending in a beak-like hook. Another kind consisted of many thongs of skin plaited and interwoven with wire, ending in loose wired ends, like the cat-o-nine tails. 

This was soaked in milk and dried in the sun to make it harder.
 
Knouts were used in Russia for flogging as formal corporal punishment of criminals and political offenders. The victim was tied to a post or on a triangle of wood and stripped, receiving the specified number of strokes on the back. A sentence of 100 or 120 lashes was equivalent to a death sentence.  Even twenty lashes could maim, and with the specially extended Great Knout, twenty blows could kill, with death sometimes being attributed to the breaking of the spine.

The executioner was usually a criminal who had to pass through a probation and regular training, being let off his own penalties in return for his services. Peter the Great is traditionally accused of knouting his son Alexis to death; the latter was tortured by knouting to extract confessions.

Emperor Nicholas I abolished the punishment by knout in 1845, and replaced it with the pleti, lashes with three  thongs which could end in lead balls. They were later abolished throughout Russia and reserved for the penal settlements, mainly in Siberia. Prisoners transported to Siberia in the late 19th century were sometimes branded on their foreheads with irons with the letters VRNK meaning V thief, R robber, and NK punished by the knout. This branding led to the Siberian slang word "varnok", meaning either a settler or deportee.

Elsewhere and metaphoric use
The instrument became synonymous in Western European languages with what was seen as the tyrannical cruelty of the autocratic government of Russia, much as the sjambok brought to mind the apartheid government of South Africa or the bullwhip was associated with the period of slavery and Jim Crow laws in America. Similarly, the fimba or chicote symbolized the Congo Free State - a hippo-hide whip much like the Boer sjambok. 
 
The expression "under the knout" is used to designate any harsh totalitarianism, and by extension its equivalent in a private context, e.g., a grim patriarch ruling his household "with an iron rod". In Dutch, "onder de knoet houden" is commonly used for strict party discipline, e.g., eliminating actual debate when passing a law (compare the whip function in English).

See also 
 Nagaika

References

External links 
 

Whips